Xenorma ravida is a moth of the family Notodontidae. It is found in western Ecuador.

The length of the forewings is 13–16 mm for males and 14.5-16.5 mm for females. The ground color of the forewings is chocolate brown and the ground color of the hindwings is brown, with a wide band of dark chocolate brown along the outer margin.

Etymology
The name is taken from the Latin ravus (meaning grayish yellow) and refers to the color of the central area of the hindwing.

References

Moths described in 2008
Notodontidae of South America